Måns Gustaf Daniel Nathanaelson (born 18 September 1976 in Stockholm, Sweden) is a Swedish actor, best known his role as Oskar Bergman in the films about the police detective Martin Beck.

Filmography
Äkta Människor (2012)
Beck – Levande begravd (2010)
I taket lyser stjärnorna (2009)
Beck – I stormens öga (2009)
Oskyldigt dömd (2008)
Beck – I Guds namn (2007)
Beck – Det tysta skriket (2007)
Beck – Den svaga länken (2007)
Beck – Den japanska shungamålningen (2007)
Beck – Gamen (2007)
Beck – Advokaten (2006)
Beck – Flickan i jordkällaren (2006)
Beck – Skarpt läge (2006)
Frostbiten (2006)
Kim Novak badade aldrig i Genesarets sjö (2005)
Mongolpiparen (2004)
 1997 – Vita lögner
1992–97 - Rederiet

References

External links

1976 births
Living people
Male actors from Stockholm
Swedish male film actors
Swedish male television actors
20th-century Swedish male actors
21st-century Swedish male actors